Ana María Alvarado (born November 28, 1968 in Mexico City) is a Mexican journalist.

She's worked for 32 years on the famous radio program "Todo para la mujer" together with Maxine Woodside. Ana talks about Mexican and international entertainment. She's well known as one of the best periodists of Mexican TV and Radio.

She also participated from 2000 until 2005 on the TV show "Cada Mañana" and she nowadays takes part on the TV show "Venga la Alegría" together with Ingrid Coronado and Fernando del Solar.

Since 2017 she has been the host of "Sale el sol" for "Imagen Television" TV channel 103 in Mexico

References 

Mexican radio presenters
Mexican women writers
Mexican women radio presenters
Writers from Mexico City
1968 births
Living people
Mexican journalists
Mexican women journalists